John Campbell  (born 1938) is a British engineer and one of the world's leading experts in the casting industry with approximately 150 papers, and 20 patents.
Campbell holds two Master's degrees from University of Cambridge and University of Sheffield, as well as two doctorates from University of Birmingham.
He is a fellow of the Royal Academy of Engineering, and he was appointed to the chair of casting technology at University of Birmingham.
The Institute of Cast Metals Engineers has named the "John Campbell Medal" after him.

References 

Living people
English metallurgists
1938 births
Alumni of the University of Cambridge
Alumni of the University of Sheffield
Alumni of the University of Birmingham
Academics of the University of Birmingham
Officers of the Order of the British Empire